David 'Foggy' Lyttle (13 May 1944, in Belfast, Northern Ireland – 25 December 2003), was a guitarist, best known for his work with Van Morrison. Morrison's 2005 album Magic Time was dedicated to him, as he had died within weeks of completion of the recording. The album credits described him as "a respected colleague and fine performer who brought a unique flavour to many of [the album's] tracks."

Some of the many artist Lyttle has played with include Sinéad O'Connor, Brian Kennedy, The Chieftains, Marianne Faithfull, Liam Neeson, Harry Nilsson, Phil Everly, Gene Pitney, Acker Bilk and Elton John.

Notes

External links
 
  

1944 births
2003 deaths
Musicians from Belfast
Guitarists from Northern Ireland
20th-century guitarists